Constitutional delay of growth and puberty (CDGP) is a term describing a temporary delay in the skeletal growth and thus height of a child with no physical abnormalities causing the delay.  Short stature may be the result of a growth pattern inherited from a parent (familial) or occur for no apparent reason (idiopathic).  Typically at some point during childhood, growth slows down, eventually resuming at a normal rate.  CDGP is the most common cause of short stature and delayed puberty.

Synonyms 
 Constitutional Delay of Growth and Adolescence (CDGA)
 Constitutional Growth Delay (CGD)

See also
 Idiopathic short stature
 Failure to thrive

References

Developmental biology
Pediatrics
Sexuality and age
Human height